General Petar Terzić also spelled Peter Tersich von Cadesich (Serbian Cyrillic: Генерал Петар Терзић; Kovilj, Slavonia, Habsburg monarchy, 1739 - Pančevo, Banat, Habsburg Monarchy, 22 December 1806) was an Austrian nobleman, major general who fought in both the Ottoman and Napoleonic wars.

Biography
Petar Terzić was born in 1739 in Kovilj in Slavonia the part of the Military Frontier of the ever-present conflict between the forces of two empires from the early 1600s into the 1900s. Petar Terzić came from an old Serbian family with a military history dating back in time. In 1751 he became a cadet; in 1752, an ensign; and in 1753, lieutenant. As a graduate cadet of the Imperial-Royal Army in the Habsburg Monarchy, he rose through the military ranks, in 1965, he was promoted to captain; and by 1790, he was a colonel.

In the Serbian Banat there were the occasional occurrence of depriving officers and frontier guardsmen of their rank. Terzić would always support the Serbian claim in military lawsuits when General Peter Duka came to adjudicate even though Duka sought to blunt the accusations.

In 1804 when the First Serbian Uprising broke out, Terzić openly supported Karađorđe's Serbia at a time when Austria stood neutral. Again Terzić found himself in trouble with his superiors for supporting Serb rebels and, if it were not for General Duka's intervention at a trial, General Terzić would have faced a court-martial. It was Terzić who recorded the exact date of the start of the Serbian Revolution, "7 March 1804".

He was promoted to brigadier general in 1794 and on 21 August 1796 he received the rank of General Major. He retired in 1807 but died the following year at the age of 67.

See also
 Peter Duka von Kadar
 Martin von Dedovich
 Joseph von Dedovich
 Paul Dimich
 Ignaz Stojanich
 Aron Stanisavljević
 Andreas von Stoichevich

References 

1739 births
1806 deaths
People from  Slavonia
Major generals
Austro-Hungarian generals
Austrian Empire commanders of the Napoleonic Wars
Austro-Turkish Wars